The Grimy Awards is the third studio album by American rapper Ill Bill. It was released on February 26, 2013 through Fat Beats Records. Recording sessions took place at Found Sound Studios in Philadelphia, at Busy B Studios and at Kill Devil Hills in North Carolina, and at HeadQcourterz Studios in New York. Production was handled by Junior Makhno, MoSS, Pete Rock, Psycho Les, DJ Skizz, Large Professor, Ayatollah, El-P, DJ Muggs, C-Lance, DJ Premier, and Ill Bill himself. It features guest appearances from A-Trak, Cormega, El-P, H.R., Jedi Mind Tricks, Lil' Fame, Meyhem Lauren, O.C., Q-Unique, Shabazz the Disciple and Tia Thomas.

Track listing

Charts

References

External links

2013 albums
Ill Bill albums
Albums produced by El-P
Albums produced by DJ Muggs
Albums produced by Ayatollah
Albums produced by Pete Rock
Albums produced by DJ Premier
Albums produced by Large Professor